Ted Griffin (born December 21, 1970) is an American screenwriter whose credits include Ravenous, Matchstick Men, and Ocean's Eleven.

Born in Pasadena, California, Griffin graduated from Colgate University in 1993. He was scheduled to make his directorial debut with Rumor Has It..., for which he had written the original screenplay, but was replaced by Rob Reiner 12 days after principal filming began. He did a rewrite on the Ashton Kutcher film Killers.  He moved into television by creating Terriers for FX. Griffin played Agent Hughes in The Wolf of Wall Street.

His brother is screenwriter Nicholas Griffin. His maternal grandparents were director William A. Seiter and Finnish American actress Marian Nixon.

Griffin became engaged to actress Sutton Foster in August 2013. He and Foster married on October 25, 2014.

Filmography
Puddle Cruiser (1996) as Rick Johnson
Ravenous (1999, Writer)
Best Laid Plans (1999, Writer)
Ocean's Eleven (2001, Writer)
Matchstick Men (2003, Writer) (with Nicholas Griffin)
Must Love Dogs (2005) as Bill Jr.
Rumor Has It... (2005, Writer)
The Shield (2006, TV Series, Writer)
Killers (2010) (with Bob DeRosa)
Terriers (2011, TV Series, Writer) (Creator with Shawn Ryan)
Tower Heist (2011) (with Jeff Nathanson)
Prom (2011, Producer)
Shoot the Messenger (2012, also Director)
The Wolf of Wall Street (2013, Co-producer) as Agent Hughes
Solace (2015, Writer)
Pretend It's a City (2021, executive producer)

References

External links

The Dialogue: Learn from the Masters interview

American male screenwriters
Colgate University alumni
Living people
Writers from Pasadena, California
1970 births
Screenwriters from California
Screenwriters from New York (state)
American people of Finnish descent